The People's Republic of China possesses a diversified communications system that links all parts of the country by Internet, telephone, telegraph, radio, and television. The country is served by an extensive system of automatic telephone exchanges connected by modern networks of fiber-optic cable, coaxial cable, microwave radio relay, and a domestic satellite system; cellular telephone service is widely available, expanding rapidly, and includes roaming service to foreign countries. Fiber to the x infrastructure has been expanded rapidly in recent years.

History

When the People's Republic was founded in 1949, the telecommunication systems and facilities in China first established by the Qing and Republican ITA and Ministry of Posts and Communications had been seriously damaged from over thirty years of on and off war between warlords, Japan, and the two sides of the Chinese Civil War. What little remained was largely outdated and rudimentary and limited to the eastern coastal cities, the Nanjing-Shanghai region, and a few interior cities. In the 1950s existing facilities were repaired, and, with Soviet assistance, considerable progress was made toward establishing a long-distance telephone wire network connecting Beijing to provincial-level capitals.

Communications in China were established rapidly in the early 1950s. By 1952 the principal telecommunications network centered on Beijing, and links to all large cities had finally been established. Work quickly got under way to repair, renovate and expand the system, and from 1956 telecommunications routes were extended more rapidly. To increase the efficiency of the communications system, the same lines were used for both telegraphic and telephone service, while Teletype and television (broadcasting) services were also added.

In addition, conference telephone service was initiated, radio communications were improved, and the production of telecommunications equipment was accelerated. Growth in telecommunications halted with the general economic collapse after the Great Leap Forward (1958–60) but revived in the 1960s after the telephone network was expanded and improved equipment was introduced, including imports of Western plants and equipment.

By 1963 telephone wire had been laid from Beijing to the capitals of all provinces, autonomous regions, and large cities, while in turn, provincial capitals and autonomous regions were connected to the administrative seats of the counties, smaller municipalities and larger market towns.

In the years immediately following 1949, telecommunications — by telegraph or telephone — mainly used wire; by the 1970s, however, radio telecommunications equipment were increasingly used and began to replace wire lines. Microwave and satellite transmissions were soon introduced and have now become common. (China launched its first television-broadcast satellite in 1986.) In 1956 the first automatic speed Teletype was installed on the Beijing-Lhasa line. By 1964 such machines had been installed in most of China's major cities. Radio-television service also was installed in major cities, and radio teleprinters became widely used.

An important component of the Fourth Five-Year Plan (1971–75) was a major development program for the telecommunications system. The program allotted top priority to scarce electronics and construction resources and dramatically improved all aspects of China's telecommunications capabilities.

Microwave radio relay lines and buried cable lines were constructed to create a network of wideband carrier trunk lines, which covered the entire country. China was linked to the international telecommunications network by the installation of communications satellite ground stations and the construction of coaxial cables linking Guangdong Province with Hong Kong and Macau. Provincial-level units and municipalities rapidly expanded local telephone and wire broadcasting networks. Expansion and modernization of the telecommunications system continued throughout the late-1970s and early 1980s, giving particular emphasis to the production of radio and television sets and expanded broadcasting capabilities.

Marked improvements occurred by the mid-1980s with an influx of foreign technology and increased domestic production capabilities. International and long-distance telephone links by cable and satellite of high quality multiplied. Telegraph, facsimile, and telex were all in use. International satellite ground stations in Beijing and Shanghai were built and a domestic satellite communication network was operational in 1986. Over 160 radio stations existed by the mid-1980s, and transistorized radio receivers were common. A vast wired broadcasting system included over 2,600 stations carrying radio transmissions into all rural units and many urban areas. The television system grew rapidly in 1980s, with 90 television stations and 80 million sets by 1987.

By 1987 China possessed a diversified telecommunications system that linked all parts of the country by telephone, telegraph, radio, and television. None of the telecommunications forms were as prevalent or as advanced as those in modern Western countries, but the system included some of the most sophisticated technology in the world and constituted a foundation for further development of a modern network.

Overall, China's telecommunications services improved enormously during the 1980s, and, the pace of telecommunications growth and technology upgrading increased even more rapidly after 1990, especially as fiber-optic systems and digital technology were installed. After 1997, China's telecommunications services were enhanced further with the acquisition of Hong Kong's highly advanced systems. In the late 1990s and early 2000s, foreign investment in the country's telecommunications sector further encouraged growth. Notable has been the tremendous increase in Internet and cellular phone usage. China became the world leader in the early 21st century, in terms of number of cell phone subscribers. The nation ranks first in the world in numbers of both mobile and fixed-line telephones, and first in the number of internet users.

Experts claim that 'although the number of cellular phones has grown enormously, surpassing that for standard (i.e., landline) telephones in 2003, the overall ratio of phones per capita had, by 2004, remained much smaller than it was for the developed countries.'.

China is the largest user of largest Voice calling over the Internet or Voice over Internet Protocol (VoIP) services with 51 million Tom-Skype users as of November 2007.

History of telecommunications services
In 1987 the Ministry of Posts and Telecommunications (now the Ministry of Information Industry) administered China's telecommunications systems and related research and production facilities. Besides postal services, some of which were handled by electronic means, the ministry was involved in a wide spectrum of telephone, wire, telegraph, and international communications (see Postage stamps and postal history of the People's Republic of China). The Ministry of Radio and Television was established as a separate entity in 1982 to administer and upgrade the status of television and radio broadcasting. Subordinate to this ministry were the Central People's Broadcasting Station, Radio Beijing, and China Central Television. Additionally, the various broadcasting training, talent-search, research, publishing, and manufacturing organizations were brought under the control of the Ministry of Radio and Television. In 1986 responsibility for the movie industry was transferred from the Ministry of Culture to the new Ministry of Radio, Cinema, and Television.

As of 1987 the quality of telecommunications services in China had improved markedly over earlier years. A considerable influx of foreign technology and increased domestic production capabilities had a major impact in the post-Mao period.

The primary form of telecommunications in the 1980s was local and long-distance telephone service administered by six regional bureaus: Beijing (north region), Shanghai (east region), Xi'an (northwest region), Chengdu (southwest region), Wuhan (centralsouth region), and Shenyang (northeast region). These regional headquarters served as switching centers for provincial-level subsystems. By 1986 China had nearly 3 million telephone exchange lines, including 34,000 long-distance exchange lines with direct, automatic service to 24 cities. By late 1986 fiber optic communications technology was being employed to relieve the strain on existing telephone circuits. International service was routed through overseas exchanges located in Beijing and Shanghai. Guangdong Province had coaxial cable and microwave lines linking it to Hong Kong and Macau.

The large, continuously upgraded satellite ground stations, originally installed in 1972 to provide live coverage of the visits to China by U.S. president Richard M. Nixon and Japanese prime minister Kakuei Tanaka, still served as the base for China's international satellite communications network in the mid-1980s. By 1977 China had joined Intelsat and, using ground stations in Beijing and Shanghai, had linked up with satellites over the Indian and Pacific oceans.

In April 1984 China launched an experimental communications satellite for trial transmission of broadcasts, telegrams, telephone calls, and facsimile, probably to remote areas of the country. In February 1986 China launched its first fully operational telecommunications and broadcast satellite. The quality and communications capacity of the second satellite reportedly was much greater than the first. In mid-1987 both satellites were still functioning. With these satellites in place China's domestic satellite communication network went into operation, facilitating television and radio transmissions and providing direct-dial longdistance telephone, telegraph, and facsimile service. The network had ground stations in Beijing, Urumqi, Hohhot, Lhasa, and Guangzhou, which also were linked to an Intelsat satellite over the Indian Ocean.

Telegraph development received lower priority than the telephone network largely because of the difficulties involved in transmitting the written Chinese language. Computer technology gradually alleviated these problems and facilitated further growth in this area. By 1983 China had nearly 10,000 telegraph cables and telex lines transmitting over 170 million messages annually. Most telegrams were transmitted by cables or by shortwave radio. Cutmicrowave transmission also was used. Teletype transmission was used for messages at the international level, but some 40 percent of county and municipal telegrams were transmitted by Morse code.

Apart from traditional telegraph and telephone services, China also had facsimile, low-speed data-transmission, and computer-controlled telecommunications services. These included on-line information retrieval terminals in Beijing, Changsha, and Baotou that enabled international telecommunications networks to retrieve news and scientific, technical, economic, and cultural information from international sources.

High-speed newspaper-page-facsimile equipment and Chinese character – code translation equipment were used on a large scale. Sixty-four-channel program-controlled automatic message retransmission equipment and low- or medium-speed data transmission and exchange equipment also received extensive use. International telex service was available in coastal cities and special economic zones.

The Central People's Broadcasting Station controlled China's national radio network. Programming was administered by the provincial-level units. The station produced general news and cultural and educational programs. It also provided programs directed toward Taiwan and overseas Chinese listeners. Radio Beijing broadcast to the world in thirty-eight foreign languages, Standard Mandarin, and a number of Chinese varieties, including Xiamen, Cantonese, and Hakka. It also provided English-language news programs aimed at foreign residents in Beijing. Medium-wave, shortwave, and FM stations reached 80 percent of the country — over 160 radio stations and 500 relay and transmission stations — with some 240 radio programs.

The nationwide network of wire lines and loudspeakers transmitted radio programs into virtually all rural communities and many urban areas. By 1984 there were over 2,600 wired broadcasting stations, extending radio transmissions to rural areas outside the range of regular broadcasting stations.

In 1987 China Central Television (CCTV), the state network, managed China's television programs. In 1985 consumers purchased 15 million new sets, including approximately 4 million color sets. Production fell far short of demand. Because Chinese viewers often gathered in large groups to watch publicly owned sets, authorities estimated that two-thirds of the nation had access to television. In 1987 there were about 70 million television sets, an average of 29 sets per 100 families. CCTV had four channels that supplied programs to the over ninety television stations throughout the country. Construction began on a major new CCTV studio in Beijing in 1985. CCTV produced its own programs, a large portion of which were educational, and the Television University in Beijing produced three educational programs weekly. The English-language lesson was the most popular program and had an estimated 5 to 6 million viewers. Other programs included daily news, entertainment, teleplays, and special programs. Foreign programs included films and cartoons. Chinese viewers were particularly interested in watching international news, sports, and drama (see Culture of the People's Republic of China).

Recent development
The former telecoms regulator – the Ministry of Information Industry (MII) – reported in 2004 that China had 295 million subscribers to main telephone lines and 305 million cellular telephone subscribers, the highest numbers in both categories. Both categories showed substantial increases over the previous decade; in 1995 there were only 3.6 million cellular telephone subscribers and around 20 million main-line telephone subscribers. By 2003 there were 42 telephones per 100 population.

Internet use also has soared in China from about 60,000 Internet users in 1995 to 22.5 million users in 2000; by 2005 the number had reached 103 million. Although this figure is well below the 159 million users in the United States and although fairly low per capita, it was second in the world and on a par with Japan’s 57 million users.

By the June 2010, China had 420 million internet users.  Incidentally, this is greater than the population of the US, however penetration rate is still relatively low at just under 32%.  See Internet in the People's Republic of China

China's 2.7 million kilometers of optical fiber telecommunication cables by 2003 assisted greatly in the modernization process. China produces an increasing volume of televisions both for domestic use and export, which has helped to spread communications development. In 2001 China produced more than 46 million televisions and claimed 317 million sets in use. At the same time, there were 417 million radios in use in China, a rate of 342 per 1,000 population. However, many more are reached, especially in rural areas, via loudspeaker broadcasts of radio programs that bring transmissions to large numbers of radioless households.

In March 2012, the Ministry of Industry and Information Technology announced that China has 1.01 billion mobile phone subscribers; of these, 144 million are connected to 3G networks. At the same time, the number of landline phones dropped by 828,000 within the span of two months to a total of 284.3 million.

Regulation
The primary regulator of communications, in particular telecommunications, in China is the Ministry of Industry and Information Technology (MIIT). It closely regulates all of the industries outlined below with the exception of the radio and television sectors, which belong to the remit of the State Administration of Radio, Film, and Television.

Since 2014, the Cyberspace Administration of China is responsible for setting policy and the regulatory framework for user content generated in online social activities on Internet portals.

Sectors

Telephone

Telephones – main lines in use: 284.3 million (March 2012)
Telephones – mobile cellular subscribers: 1.01 billion (March 2012)
Telephone country code: 86 (see Telephone numbers in China)

China imported its first mobile phone telecommunication facilities in 1987 and it took a decade for the number of subscribers to reach 10 million. Four years later, in 2001, the country had the largest number of mobile phone subscribers in the world.

Domestic and international services are increasingly available for private use. But an unevenly distributed domestic system serves principal cities, industrial centers, and many towns. China continues to develop its telecommunications infrastructure, and is partnering with foreign providers to expand its global reach; 3 of China's 6 major telecommunications operators are part of an international consortium which, in December 2006, signed an agreement with Verizon Business to build the first next-generation optical cable system directly linking the United States and China.

In December 2005, its combined main lines and mobile lines exceeded 743 million.

By the end of August 2006, statistics from the Ministry of Information Industry showed that there were more than 437 million mobile phone users in the Chinese mainland, or 327 mobile phones per 1,000 population. The combined main lines and mobile lines is expected to hit 976 million by 2008.

From January to August 2006, mobile phone users on the mainland sent 273.67 million text messages.

On average, China's mobile subscribers increased by 4.78 million each month.

Domestic interprovincial fiber-optic trunk lines and cellular telephone systems have been installed.

A domestic satellite system with 55 earth stations was in place.

International satellite earth stations include 5 Intelsat (4 Pacific Ocean and 1 Indian Ocean), 1 Intersputnik (Indian Ocean region) and 1 Inmarsat (Pacific and Indian Ocean regions).

Several international fiber-optic links include those to Japan, South Korea, Hong Kong, Russia, and Germany.

Fixed and mobile operators in China include China Mobile, China Netcom, China TieTong, China Satcom (former), China Telecom and China Unicom.

Radio

Radio broadcast stations: AM 369, FM 259, shortwave 45 (1998)
Radios: 428 million [33 per 100 persons] (2000)

Television

Television companies: 358 (2008)
Television broadcast stations: 3,240 (of which 209 are operated by China Central Television, 31 are provincial TV stations and nearly 3,000 are local city stations) (1997)
Televisions: 493.90 million [38 per 100 persons] (2016)

Internet

Internet country code: .cn
Internet hosts: 13.57 million (2008)
Internet service providers (ISP): 3 (2000)
Internet users: 513 million (December 2011)
Broadband Internet users: 363.81 million (June 2010)
Personal computers: 52,990,000 units [4 per 100 persons] (2004)
Hosting 29% of the globally installed bandwidth capacity in 2014 (see Figure)

In 2014 only 3 countries (China, US, Japan) host 50% of the globally installed telecommunication bandwidth potential. China replaced the U.S. in its global leadership in terms of installed bandwidth in 2011. By 2014, China hosts more than twice as much national bandwidth potential than the U.S., the historical leader in terms of installed telecommunication bandwidth (29% versus 13% of the global total) (see pie charts).

China's number of Internet users or netizens topped 137 million by the end of 2006, an increase of 23.4% from a year before and 162 million by June 2007, making China the second largest Internet user after the United States. The latest figure (December 2011) have China's internet users exceeding 513 million making it the largest internet user in the world.

As of 2004, the largest concentration of Internet users were from Guangdong, Zhejiang, Fujian, Jiangsu, Liaoning, Shandong and Hubei provinces. Beijing, Shanghai and Tianjin also had a high concentration of Internet users, with 28% of Beijing's population having access to the Internet.

As of 31 December 2005, there were an estimated 37,504,000 broadband lines in China. It represented nearly a world share of 18%. Over 70% of the broadband lines were via DSL and the rest via cable modems.

According to the China Internet Network Information Centre (CNNIC), by June 2006, China's broadband users had reached 77 million or about two-thirds of the total online population, up 45% from a year ago. By June 2007 China's broadband users had reached 122 million. The number of websites had also risen by more than 110,000 to a total of 788,400.

As of 2007, ITU data puts China's broadband speed at 1Mbit/s. China is fast becoming the world's largest broadband economy. It is laying quite a lot of fiber which is a less disruptive option in China because of the amount of new building work being done. It has 14 million fiber lines, compared to 9.6 million in Japan, 1.7m in the US and just a few thousand in the UK but it does not generate the same speeds as in other Asian countries because the fiber tends to feed into apartment blocks rather than individual homes.

There exists a wide gap between Internet use in cities and rural areas, as statistics show. The national average internet penetration rate is still just 31.8% (June 2010). At the end of June 2007 there were 37.41 million netizens in the rural areas, making up only 5.1 percent of the rural population and around 125 million netizens living in the urban areas, making up 21.6 percent of the urban population, according to the National Development and Reform Commission (NDRC).
The CNNIC survey showed 82.3 per cent of people using the Internet in China were below 35 years old and almost 40 per cent of the netizens were aged 18 to 24. QQ is the most popular form of instant messaging on the Internet in China.

By 2021, China was planning to field a satellite internet constellation to provide domestic China satellite internet to rural areas that can be regulated by the Chinese government. Beginning in 2019, US (SpaceX Starlink) and UK (OneWeb, 2020 private companies had begun fielding internet satellite constellations with global coverage; however China does not intend to license non-Chinese technical solutions for use in the realm of Chinese law.

Mobile phone web users
The number of mobile phone web users in China was 73.05 million by June 2008, making up about 30% of China's 253 million internet users.

Chinese mobile phone users access the Internet mainly via WAP (Wireless Application Protocol). Numbers of active WAP users and WAP sites with independent domain names amounted to 39 million and 65,000 respectively by March 2007.

It is expected that in 2008 there will be 230 million WAP users in China with a total market valued at RMB 22 billion.

Trans-Pacific Express

The Trans-Pacific Express is a telecommunications project to connect the United States with China with a fiber-optic cable that is designed to meet increasing internet traffic between the regions, with 60 times more capacity than existing cables. It is to be the first undersea or submarine telecommunications cable that directly links the US with China and the first independent trans-Pacific connection. Current cable links between China and the US run through Japan.

The project includes US Verizon Communications, Chinese firms China Telecom, China Netcom and China Unicom, South Korea's Korea Telecom and Taiwan's Chunghwa Telecom. The project was initiated in December 2006. Work began in mid-October 2007 in Qingdao. It was scheduled to be completed by July 2008 (before the Beijing Olympics).

Earthquake hotspots have been avoided in the planned route of the cable to avoid potential disruption to internet and telephone networks in Asia. The cable will extend more than 18,000 km and will cost about $500m. It will terminate in Nedonna Beach, Oregon with connections to Taiwan and South Korea. When complete, the new cable will be able to support the equivalent of 62 million simultaneous phone calls, with the design capacity to support future internet growth and advanced applications such as video and e-commerce.

See also
Internationalized domain name (IDN.IDN) for non-ASCII characters
Chinese telegraph code
Digital divide in China
CERNET (China Education and Research Network)
Media in China and its history
Electronics industry in China
Postal system in China
China Software Industry Association
Mobile phone industry in China
EUChinaGRID
Internet censorship in the People's Republic of China
List of telephone operating companies

References

External links
Ministry of Information Industry  at gov.cn
China Academy of Telecommunications Research 
China Statistical Information Net